János Vass (4 May 1873 – 19 April 1936) was a Hungarian politician, who served as Minister of Religion in 1919. He organized the Council of Religion with participating of Jusztin Baranyay, Sándor Giesswein, Ákos Timon, Béla Turi and Miklós Zborai.

References
 Magyar Életrajzi Lexikon

1873 births
1936 deaths
Government ministers of Hungary